"You Sent Me Flying" is a song by English singer and songwriter Amy Winehouse from her debut studio album Frank (2003). Written by Winehouse and Felix Howard, the song was released on 5 April 2004 as the album's third single, with "In My Bed" as its A-side. The single peaked at number 60 on the UK Singles Chart.

Track listing
UK CD single
"In My Bed" (Radio Edit) – 4:05
"You Sent Me Flying" – 3:52
"Best Friend" (Acoustic) – 3:28

UK 12" single
A1. "In My Bed" (Bugz in the Attic Vocal Mix)
A2. "You Sent Me Flying"
B1. "In My Bed" (Bass Gangsta)
B2. "In My Bed" (Radio Edit)

Charts

References

2003 songs
2004 singles
Amy Winehouse songs
Island Records singles
Song recordings produced by Salaam Remi
Songs written by Amy Winehouse